Stanwood is a city in Cedar County, Iowa, United States. The population was 637 at the time of the 2020 census.

History
Stanwood was platted in 1868. The first house was built in Stanwood in 1869. The city was named for H. P. Stanwood, a railroad official.

Geography
Stanwood is located at  (41.891907, -91.150694).

Demographics

2010 census
As of the census of 2010, there were 684 people, 275 households, and 192 families living in the city. The racial makeup of the city was 97.1% White, 0.3% African American, 0.6% Asian, 0.3% from other races, and 1.8% from two or more races. Hispanic or Latino of any race were 2.2% of the population.

There were 275 households, of which 34.5% had children under the age of 18 living with them, 49.1% were married couples living together, 14.2% had a female householder with no husband present, 6.5% had a male householder with no wife present, and 30.2% were non-families. 26.2% of all households were made up of individuals, and 11.3% had someone living alone who was 65 years of age or older. The average household size was 2.49 and the average family size was 2.97.

The median age in the city was 40.3 years. 26.8% of residents were under the age of 18; 6.7% were between the ages of 18 and 24; 22.6% were from 25 to 44; 27.8% were from 45 to 64; and 16.1% were 65 years of age or older. The gender makeup of the city was 49.3% male and 50.7% female.

2000 census
As of the census of 2000, there were 680 people, 279 households, and 193 families living in the city. The racial makeup of the city was 97.79% White, 0.29% African American, 0.44% Native American, 0.29% Asian, and 1.18% from two or more races. Hispanic or Latino of any race were 0.15% of the population.

There were 279 households, out of which 30.5% had children under the age of 18 living with them, 59.9% were married couples living together, 7.9% had a female householder with no husband present, and 30.8% were non-families. 25.4% of all households were made up of individuals, and 12.2% had someone living alone who was 65 years of age or older. The average household size was 2.44 and the average family size was 2.94.

In the city, the population was spread out, with 24.1% under the age of 18, 6.9% from 18 to 24, 28.2% from 25 to 44, 24.3% from 45 to 64, and 16.5% who were 65 years of age or older. The median age was 38 years. For every 100 females, there were 101.2 males. For every 100 females age 18 and over, there were 95.5 males.

The median income for a household in the city was $37,102, and the median income for a family was $42,143. Males had a median income of $30,781 versus $21,691 for females. The per capita income for the city was $16,561. About 7.2% of families and 7.4% of the population were below the poverty line, including 10.8% of those under age 18 and 5.8% of those age 65 or over.

Education
The North Cedar Community School District serves the community.  It was established on July 1, 1995 by the merger of the Clarence-Lowden Community School District and the Lincoln Community School District.

References

Cities in Cedar County, Iowa
Cities in Iowa
1868 establishments in Iowa